Wright is an unincorporated community in southern Roanoke County, Virginia, United States.  The community lies along U.S. 220 near the Franklin County line.

References

Unincorporated communities in Roanoke County, Virginia
Unincorporated communities in Virginia